Arturo Castro (born November 26, 1985) is a Guatemalan actor best known for his portrayal of Jaimé Castro on the Comedy Central series Broad City, and David Rodríguez on the Netflix series Narcos.

Career
Castro hosted his own show, Conexion, on Guatemala's national network, a year before moving to New York City. In New York, he attended the American Academy of Dramatic Arts, and where he met Abbi Jacobson and Ilana Glazer and landed the role of Jaimé in Broad City. Castro had one of the leading roles in Ang Lee's war drama Billy Lynn's Long Halftime Walk, playing Marcellino "Mango" Montoya, a member of Billy Lynn's Bravo Squad.

In 2017 Arturo landed a role as David Rodríguez, son of Cali Cartel kingpin Miguel Rodríguez Orejuela, in season 3 of the Netflix series Narcos. He also played Jose in Bushwick, a film about 20-year-old Lucy and war veteran Stupe depending on each other for survival when a Texas military force invades their Brooklyn neighborhood. He starred in Comedy Central's Alternatino with Arturo Castro, a sketch comedy show centering on life as a modern Latino man.

Influences 
Castro cites Eddie Izzard, Robin Williams, and Al Pacino as major acting and comedic influences.

Filmography

Films

Television

See also
 Broad City

References

External links 
 
 

1985 births
Living people
Guatemalan actors
21st-century Guatemalan male actors
Guatemalan male film actors
Guatemalan male television actors